Charles Keene (born in Beaver Falls, Pennsylvania) was an American racecar driver active during the formative years of the auto racing.

Career statistics

By season

Indy 500 results

References

External links
 

Indianapolis 500 drivers
People from Beaver Falls, Pennsylvania
Racing drivers from Pennsylvania
Year of birth missing
Year of death missing